May is an unincorporated community in northwest McDonald County, in the U.S. state of Missouri.

History
A post office called May was established in 1884, and remained in operation until 1907. Some say the community has the name of May Maynard, the daughter of a local physician, while others believe the place name is derived directly from the doctor's last name.

References

Unincorporated communities in McDonald County, Missouri
Unincorporated communities in Missouri